Nga mesi i errësirës ("From the midst of darkness") is a 1978 Albanian drama film directed by Kristaq Dhamo and written by Vath Koreshi.

Cast
Krenar Arifi
Petrika Gjezi ....  Gjergji
Theofil Haxhijani
Ndrek Luca
Zhani Petro
Albert Vërria
Petraq Xhillari

Sources
 "Filmi shqiptar 1977-1987". Tirana: Shtepia Botuese 8 Nentori, 1990, pp. 14–15.
 Abaz Hoxha, 2002: "Enciklopedia e kinematografise shqiptare. Autore & vepra". Tirana: Toena

External links
 

1978 films
1978 drama films
Albanian-language films
Albanian black-and-white films
Films directed by Kristaq Dhamo